Vytas Gašpuitis (born 4 March 1994) is a Lithuanian footballer who plays as a defender for V.League 1 club Song Lam Nghe An and the Lithuania national team.

Club career
Gašpuitis began his career with his hometown club Šiauliai in the A Lyga, spending five years with the side that included a spell on loan with lower league club Venta Kuršėnai. He subsequently spent two years each with Atlantas and Panevėžys, before joining Scottish Championship side Dunfermline Athletic in February 2021. He made his debut coming on for Scott Banks in the second half of a match against Greenock Morton on March 13, 2021. Gašpuitis and Dunfermline agreed to mutually terminate his contract in January 2022 in order to allow him to return to Lithuania.

International career
Gašpuitis made his international debut for Lithuania on 11 November 2020 in a friendly match against the Faroe Islands.

Career statistics

International

References

External links

1994 births
Living people
Sportspeople from Šiauliai
Lithuanian footballers
Lithuania under-21 international footballers
Lithuania international footballers
Association football defenders
FC Šiauliai players
FK Atlantas players
FK Panevėžys players
Dunfermline Athletic F.C. players
Song Lam Nghe An FC players
A Lyga players
Scottish Professional Football League players
V.League 1 players